Nicolò d'Arcano (1637 – 1 January 1714) was a Roman Catholic prelate who served as Bishop of Comacchio (1670–1714).

Biography
Nicolò d'Arcano was born in Cesene, Italy in 1637 and ordained a priest on 9 November 1670.
On 22 December 1670, he was appointed during the papacy of Pope Clement X as Bishop of Comacchio. On 4 January 1671, he was consecrated bishop by Marcello Santacroce, Bishop of Tivoli, with Pier Antonio Capobianco, Bishop Emeritus of Lacedonia, and Andrea Tamantini, Bishop of Cagli, serving as co-consecrators. He served as Bishop of Comacchio until his death on 1 January 1714.

While bishop, he was the principal co-consecrator of Leone Strozzi (archbishop), Bishop of Pistoia e Prato (1690); and Raimondo Ferretti, Bishop of Recanati e Loreto (1690).

References

External links and additional sources
 (for Chronology of Bishops) 
 (for Chronology of Bishops) 

17th-century Italian Roman Catholic bishops
18th-century Italian Roman Catholic bishops
Bishops appointed by Pope Clement X
People from Cesena
1637 births
1714 deaths